The forefathers of the Taroa people were two brothers Yazid and Zebed, descendants of Kerosh (Quraysh) and Manneja (Muawiyah), who lived in Arabia. Later on they separated: Zebed remained in his country of origin, while Yazid crossed the Red Sea, landed on African soil and settled on the Buri Peninsula, south of Massawa (now in Eritrea). From him were born Haranreway, Hatsotay, Toray, Schiahai, Adalie (Adaglie), Mensaay, and Mereyay. The first of these formed a branch called Haranrewa; the others a second branch with name of six people: Hazo, Taroa, Schiahay, Adallye, Mensaay and Mareya.

Migration
The new settlers were Saho who migrated from the coast to Haigat. A migration led the same groups of Saho to the plateau where they took up Tigrigna or Tigre as their language. The story continues to narrate how the Mensa and Marya left their brothers and moved towards the area where the sun sets and then moved up to Haigat. There they went in different directions. Mensaay settled at Haigat and his descendants were called Mensa, while the Mareyay settled at Erota and his descendants were called Marya. The existing population, called Tigre was subdued and Mensa and Marya became the ruling classes (Shimagele) in the area. The area mentioned above was located in the Central Eastern Highlands of Eritrea and stretched towards the north. The language spoken by the people was Tigre, closely related to the ancient Ge'ez language. Other related groups, such as the Bet Juk, settled north of Mensa. The Mensa were divided into two groups: The Beit Abrehe, with their main center at Habna (Geleb) and the Biet Eshhaqan, with their center at Mihlab.

Mensa’
The father of the tribes of Mensa’, Marya Tselim and Maria Keyeh of Senhit, Hazo and Taroa of Akele Guzai came from Arabia, through Yemen and they still remember the kinship. They also claim to be descended of the Banu-Umayyad family.

Taroa
(Tor'uwa), (153000in 1931), the most northerly of the Saho, inhabit the territory between the rivers Haddas and Algede, being nomadic between the Hamasen and the coast. The Taroa possess large herds of oxen, In origin they are a mixture of Ge'ez and Tigre-speaking peoples with Saho, They were originally Tigre Speaking but have changed to Saho although Tigre is also spoken. They claim descent from an immigrant Arab. There are two fractions, the Bait Sahar (or Sahar Are) and the Bait Mose (or Moset 'Are), the second bilingual. Many Taroa families emigrate among the peoples of Samhar.

Assaborta
The Tigre/Saho speaking Taroa people were a section of the Assaborta tribe, which was well known for its People's passionate dispositions and hard -core integrity. The Assaborta had stubbornly resisted their incorporation into the Great Coptic Tradition when they settled some centuries ago in the area now known as Tigray Province. As a result, they moved northward, finally settling in arid semi-desert areas bordering the Christian settlement in Akelle-Guzai. The Taroa nomads, Muslim and pastoralist by vocation, settled adjacent to the Tsenadegle  district.

External links
 http://kemey.blogspot.com/2009/10/conversation-with-pastor-ezra.html%20
 https://www.youtube.com/watch?v=yP5pLbLwr8o%20
 https://web.archive.org/web/20120107061654/http://www.modaina.com/the_tribes_of_sahel_and_others.html
 https://books.google.com/books?id=HnFSMf8Y3H0C&printsec=frontcover#v=onepage&q&f=false%20
 https://books.google.com/books?id=f0R7iHoaykoC&pg=PA171&lpg=PA171&dq=tora+saho&source=bl&ots=ylLEfe5SSW&sig=0yBjw_iCN7lXHq2mmb2hL-uwClU&hl=en#v=onepage&q=tora%20saho&f=false
 https://books.google.com/books?id=UfrcAAAAQBAJ&lpg=PA178&ots=5W_4BuGpLL&dq=Tor'uwa%20eritrea&pg=PA178#v=onepage&q=Tor'uwa%20eritrea&f=false

Ethnic groups in Eritrea